A merry-go-round or carousel is a popular amusement ride.

Merry-Go-Round may also refer to:

Roundabout (play), a popular park ride

Films
 The Merry-Go-Round (film), a 1920 German silent film
 Merry-Go-Round (1923 film), a film by Erich von Stroheim
 Merry-Go-Round of 1938, a 1937 comedy film by Irving Cummings
 Merry-Go-Round (1956 film), a Hungarian drama
 Merry-Go-Round (1981 film), a film by Jacques Rivette
 Merry-Go-Round (2010 film), a Turkish drama film
 Merry-Go-Round (2010 Hong Kong film), a Hong Kong film of 2010
 Merry-Go-Round (2017 film), a Ukrainian-Polish short film

Music 
 The Merry-Go-Round, a Los Angeles-based pop band

Albums
 Merry Go Round (Delinquent Habits album) (2000)
 Merry-Go-Round (Elvin Jones album) (1972)
 Merry-Go-Round, a 2000 album by Freddy Cole

Songs
 "Merry Go Round" (The Replacements song), from All Shook Down (1990) 
 "Merry-Go-Round" (Moya Brennan song), from Heart Strings (2006)
 "Merry Go Round" (Royce da 5'9" song) from Success Is Certain (2011)
 "Merry Go 'Round" (Kacey Musgraves song), from Same Trailer Different Park (2012)
 "Merry-Go-Round" (Ayumi Hamasaki song), from Colours (2014)
 "Merry-Go-Round", a 1972 song by ABBA from People Need Love
 "Merry Go Round", a 2005 song by Babyshambles from Down in Albion
 "Merry Go Round", a 2020 song by Bladee from Exeter
 "Merry-Go-Round", a 1991 song by Deborah Blando from A Different Story
 "Merry Go Round", a 1968 song by Fleetwood Mac from Fleetwood Mac
 "Merry Go Round", a 2011 song by the JaneDear Girls from the JaneDear girls
 "Merry Go Round", a 1990 song by Keith Sweat from I'll Give All My Love to You
 "Merry-Go-Round", a 1976 song by Montrose from Jump On It
 "Merry-Go-Round", a 1981 song by Mötley Crüe from Too Fast for Love
 "Merry Go Round", a 1968 song by Wild Man Fischer from An Evening with Wild Man Fischer
 "Merry-Go-Round", a 2004 song by Joe Hisaishi from  Howl's Moving Castle (film)

Other uses
 Merry-Go-Round (Gertler painting)
 Merry-Go-Round (radio programme), a World War II BBC programme
 Merry-Go-Round (TV series), a 1961 Australian television show
 Merry-Go-Round (retailer), a defunct American clothing retailer
 Merry-Go Round, an educational BBC TV series aimed at primary school children (1963-1983)

See also 
 Carousel (disambiguation)
 Emery-Go-Round, a free public transit system in Emeryville, California
 "Marry-Go-Round", a season 4 episode of TV show Charmed
 Merry-go-round train
 The Merry-Go-Round Broke Down, the intro theme for Warner Bros' Looney Tunes